Anna Mikhaylovna Knoroz (née Chuprina;  born 30 July 1970) is a retired Russian hurdler who specialised in the 400 metres hurdles. She won a bronze medal in the 400 m hurdles at the 1994 European Championships, and a gold medal in the 4 × 400 metres relay at the 1991 World Championships (ran in heats only). She also competed at the 1996 Atlanta Olympics.

As a junior, she won the silver medal at the 1989 European Junior Championships. In her early senior career she had modest success in hurdling in global events. She competed at the 1991 World Championships, the 1993 World Championships, the 1996 Olympic Games and the 1997 World Championships without reaching the final. She nonetheless won two major medals in her career. First, she ran in the heats on the Soviet team that eventually won the 4 × 400 metres relay at the 1991 World Championships. She also won the 400 metres hurdles bronze medal at the 1994 European Championships.

In somewhat lesser events, she won the bronze medal at the 1991 Summer Universiade, bronze medal at the 1994 Goodwill Games, took the third place at the 1994 IAAF World Cup, and finished sixth at the 1998 IAAF World Cup and seventh at the 1998 European Championships. She became Soviet champion in 1991 and Russian champion in 1992, 1993, 1994 and 1998.

Her personal best time of 54.11 seconds, was achieved in July 1994 in Nice.

International competitions
 All results regarding 400 metres hurdles

See also
List of World Athletics Championships medalists (women)
List of European Athletics Championships medalists (women)

References

1970 births
Living people
Athletes from Moscow
Russian female hurdlers
Soviet female hurdlers
Olympic female hurdlers
Olympic athletes of Russia
Athletes (track and field) at the 1996 Summer Olympics
Goodwill Games medalists in athletics
Competitors at the 1994 Goodwill Games
Universiade medalists in athletics (track and field)
Universiade bronze medalists for the Soviet Union
Medalists at the 1991 Summer Universiade
World Athletics Championships athletes for the Soviet Union
World Athletics Championships athletes for Russia
World Athletics Championships winners
European Athletics Championships medalists
Soviet Athletics Championships winners
Russian Athletics Championships winners